Ion Iovcev is a teacher for the Republic of Moldova. Since 1992, he has been the principal of a Romanian language school in Tiraspol and active advocate for human rights as well as a critic of the Transnistrian leadership. Ion Iovcev was decorated, by a presidential decree, with Moldova's highest state decoration – the Order of the Republic.

In November 2005 Ion Iovcev received threatening calls that he attributed to his criticism of the separatist regime.

Awards 
 Order of the Republic - highest state distinction

See also 
 Human rights in Transnistria

References

External links 
 Ion Iovcev
 Timpul de dimineaţă, Elevii din Transnistria s-au plimbat cu Mihai Ghimpu la Condrița
 Cazul Ion Iovcev

Living people
Moldova State University alumni
Moldovan journalists
Male journalists
Transnistrian people
Politics of Transnistria
History of Transnistria since 1991
Education in Moldova
Moldovan human rights activists
Recipients of the Order of the Republic (Moldova)
Year of birth missing (living people)
Romanian people of Moldovan descent